DiverCity Tokyo Plaza (ダイバーシティ東京 プラザ) is a shopping mall in Odaiba, Tokyo, Japan. It is a commercial facility located in DiverCity Tokyo, operated by Mitsui Fudosan Commercial Management.

Entertainment 

 Gundam Base Tokyo  (7F)
 A full-scale Unicorn Gundam (RG 1/1 RX-0 Unicorn Gundam Ver.TWC) is on display at the 2nd floor Festival Square, and the statue is transformed (from Unicorn mode to Destroy mode) at certain times of the day. Later in the day it can be seen lighting up. In the past, a full-scale Gundam (RG 1/1 RX-78-2 Gundam Ver.GFT) was on display.
 Round One (6th, 7th floor, stadium store)
 hexaRide  (5F)
 VR ride-type attraction controlled by a 6-axis platform. Experiences have included; Ghost in the Shell and Attack on Titan
 TYFFONIUM  (5F) 
 Next-generation MR attraction. Experiences include; Fractus, It Carnival and Tarot VR: Voyage of Reverie.
 Little Planet (5F)
 An indoor children's park known for its augmented reality experiences.
 Zepp DiverCity (TOKYO) (2F)
 A music hall
 Unko Museum TOKYO (2F)
 Known in English as the Poop Museum it opened in August 2019  .

Gallery

See also
 List of shopping malls in Japan

References

External links

 

Odaiba
Shopping centres in Japan
2012 establishments in Japan
Buildings and structures in Koto, Tokyo
Shopping malls established in 2012
Mitsui Fudosan